Eupithecia astricta is a moth in the family Geometridae. It is found in Taiwan.

References

Moths described in 1988
astricta
Moths of Asia